Chromodomain-helicase-DNA-binding protein 8 is an enzyme that in humans is encoded by the CHD8 gene.

Function 

The gene CHD8 encodes the protein chromodomain helicase DNA binding protein 8, which is a chromatin regulator enzyme that is essential during fetal development. CHD8 is an ATP dependent enzyme.

The protein contains an Snf2 helicase domain that is responsible for the hydrolysis of ATP to ADP. CHD8 encodes for a DNA helicase that function as a transcription repressor by remodeling chromatin structure by altering the position of nucleosomes. CHD8 negatively regulates Wnt signaling. Wnt signaling is important in the vertebrate early development and morphogenesis. It is believed that CHD8 also recruits the linker histone H1 and causes the repression of β-catenin and p53 target genes. The importance of CHD8 can be observed in studies where CHD8-knockout mice died after 5.5 embryonic days because of widespread p53 induced apoptosis.

Recently CD8 has been associated to the regulation of long non-coding RNAs (lncRNAs), and the regulation of X chromosome inactivation (XCI) initiation, via regulation of Xist long non-coding RNA, the master regulator of XCI, though competitive binding to Xist regulatory regions.

Clinical significance 

Mutations in this gene have been linked to a subset of autism cases in human and mouse models.

Mutations in CHD8 could lead to upregulation of β-catenin-regulated genes, in some part of the brain this upregulation can cause brain overgrowth also known as macrocephaly, which occurs in 15-35% of autistic children.

Some studies have determined the role of CHD8 in autism spectrum disorder (ASD). CHD8 expression significantly increases during human mid-fetal development. The chromatin remodeling activity and its interaction with transcriptional regulators have shown to play an important role in ASD aetiology. The developing mammalian brain has a conserved CHD8 target regions that are associated with ASD risk genes. The knockdown of CHD8 in human neural stem cells results in dysregulation of ASD risk genes that are targeted by CHD8.

References

External links

Further reading